Goombay Dance Band is a German band created in 1979 by Oliver Bendt, named after a small bay on the Caribbean island of Saint Lucia. Their music has a distinctive sound (somewhat similar to Boney M.), which is a mixture of soca, calypso and western pop. The group enjoyed greatest commercial success at the beginning of the 1980s, spawning such number 1 hits as "Sun of Jamaica", "Seven Tears" and "Aloha-Oe, Until We Meet Again". Goombay Dance Band built up a fan base across Europe and proved very popular in South Africa too, where "Sun of Jamaica" and "Aloha-Oe" entered the charts.

History
The band released the song "Sun of Jamaica" at the end of 1979. It topped the German single charts for nine weeks in 1980. Their next single was "Aloha-Oe, Until We Meet Again", based on a Liliuokalani's composition "Aloha ʻOe". The song charted within the top 5 in European charts, including the number 1 spot in Austria. The group's debut album Zauber der Karibik, internationally known as Sun of Jamaica, was met with commercial success, reaching the top 5 in several countries. The second album, Land of Gold, performed much worse, only charting outside the German top 40, but spawned hits "Eldorado" and "Rain".

In 1981, the band released the album Holiday in Paradise, which featured the song "Seven Tears". When released in the UK next year, "Seven Tears" became the band's breakthrough hit on the British market, where it topped the singles chart for three weeks and was also a million-seller. This success was followed by the release of the compilation Seven Tears, which was well received in the UK, while in mainland Europe, the band released the retrospective Tropical Dreams to a modest success.

However, the group's subsequent releases did not draw as much attention. The next studio album, Born to Win, failed to chart and did not produce any impactful hits. In 1984 and 1985, Goombay Dance Band released several non-album singles, which were commercial failures. In the 1990s, the band released several albums, including the Christmas Album and the compilation Island of Dreams, which was met with moderate chart success and featured a new version of "Sun of Jamaica". The band celebrated their 30th anniversary with a collection of new songs and re-recorded hits in 2009. The following year, they recorded "Is This the Way to the World Cup" to celebrate the 2010 FIFA World Cup.

Band members
Oliver Bendt
Alicia Bendt
Dorothy Hellings
Wendy Doorsen
Dizzy Daniel Moorehead
Mario Slijngaard

Discography

Studio albums

 A^ In German speaking countries, the album Sun of Jamaica was released as Zauber der Karibik, and in Spain, as Sol de Jamaica.
 B^ Von Hawaii bis Tomé was re-released as Sommer, Sonne, Strand and Montego Bay in 1993.
 C^ Christmas Album was re-released as Christmas by the Sea in 1997.

Compilations

Singles

See also
 Goombay – a form of Bahamian music and a drum used to create it

References

External links
 
 

Eurodisco groups
German dance music groups
German world music groups
Musical groups established in 1979
Musicians from Hamburg
CBS Records artists